North High School, usually referred to simply as North, is a public secondary school located in Des Moines, Iowa. It is one of five secondary schools under the district of the Des Moines Public Schools.

The school's mascot is a polar bear and the school competes in the Central Iowa Metro League conference.

History
North High started as the Forest Home School with four rooms, three departments (primary, intermediate, and higher grades), and three teachers. In 1885, Dr. John A. Nash gave North Des Moines The Forest Home School. it was located on Forest Avenue between 13th and 14th Streets.
 
By 1889, two rooms had been added to the school, which was established as a high school during that year. The first high school curriculum was made up of college entrance subjects: English, Latin, Greek, German, mathematics, science, history, and some art and music.
 
In 1892, the school colors were chosen. During this year, a parade was held in Des Moines, and the schools marched wearing their school colors. Miss Louise Patterson, principal of North, suggested that pink and green be used (North had previously been without colors).
 
Later in 1894, a committee was appointed to select school colors. After several combinations had been considered, one boy looked out the window and saw pink blossoms set against the green leaves of a crab apple tree. “Why not pick the colors which we have already used,” he said. The committee then chose pink and green as the official colors of North High School.
 
In 1896, North moved into a new $30,000 building located at Eighth Street and College Avenue. That building is Moulton Elementary School today.

In 1915, North High was enlarged with a second section on the North side of the school.  The original building was removed in the late 1950s and the second section was remodel for the elementary school.   
  
In 1957, North High was moved from Eight and College to the present site at Sixth and Holcomb Streets. The new building cost $3,335,397: total area of the school grounds including the athletic field is 34.5 acres.
 
In 1989, North High celebrated 100 years of serving this community. Examine the pictures of some of the outstanding graduates in the Athletic or Alumni Hall of Fame. You will soon recognize the important role North has played in helping develop local and national leadership.

In 2010, the school started a multimillion-dollar renovation which includes new offices, internet wiring, bio-thermal heating and cooling, new windows, paint, new ceilings and flooring and countless other improvements.

On September 14, 2015, 44th president of the United States, Barack Obama visited North High along with United States Secretary of Education Arne Duncan for a back-to-school bus tour. This event celebrated how states and communities are working to increase access and opportunity from early learning to college.

Friday, October 16, 2015, long-time governor Terry Branstad signed a proclamation at North declaring the month of October as College Application Month in Iowa. The purpose of the proclamation was to make students and their families aware of the importance of completing and submitting college applications early on in the process.
 
In addition to the countless improvements in the school's outside skeleton, the new administration has set its eyes on raising the bar in the classroom by looking at new innovative teaching methods.  Most notably, Des Moines Public Schools partnered with Learning Sciences International for the 2016-2017 school year to make North a Demonstration School, a school focused on rigorous coursework where students work more collaboratively with their peers.

Faculty
Benjamin Graeber replaced Mike Vukovich as principal of North High School in mid-2017. Vuokovich made many efforts to improve the school.

Extracurricular activities
North has a variety of extracurricular activities, the most notable of which is the Academic Decathlon team, which has a long history of success, including a placement of 7th in the nation in the Medium School e-Nationals (2012), a placement of fourth in the state in 2011, and has won the regional competition in 2011 and 2012.

Athletics
The Polar Bears are members of the Central Iowa Metro League, and participate in the following sports:
Fall
 Football
 Volleyball
 Cross Country
 6-time State Champions (1944, 1945, 19546, 1950, 1952, 1953)
 Boys' golf
 Girls' swimming
Winter 
 Basketball
 Bowling
 Wrestling
 Boys' swimming
 2-time State Champions (1938, 1942)
 Spring —
 Track and field
 Boys' 7-time State Champions (1917, 1919, 1934, 1948, 1953, 1954, 1959)
 Soccer
 Tennis
 Girls' golf
 Summer 
 Baseball
 3-time State Champions (1931, 1934, 1936) 
 Softball

In 2016, ESPN covered North High football and their turnaround story behind Major Sean Quinlan.

Curriculum
The school day is split into 4 blocks lasting 85 minutes that meet every other day and a 'skinny' period that lasts for 45 minutes and meets every day. The school district requires that students take a number of core academic courses, if they wish to graduate and receive a diploma. This includes social studies, English, mathematics, science, art, and physical education. The exact amount of academic credit needed to satisfy graduation requirements is determined by the school district.

All students are required by the district to enroll in four subject courses and a Physical Education course. However, the school compels lower-class students to schedule a full day of classes, in order to ensure satisfaction with district graduation requirements. Juniors and Seniors have the option of having an "open period" during the first or last period of the school day (Seniors may have open periods during any period). However, Juniors require parental permission to have an open period.  All students are required to take finals.

From being one of the bottom schools in the State of Iowa, North has tightened up their standards, and has consistently raised its expectations of its students and faculty. North has many visitors from around the country  to see what they can come away with to help their students.

North is the largest school in Iowa to provide a laptop for every student and faculty member, which it did in the 2011-2012 school year.
In 2013-14 school year, North stopped the use of the Apple Mac laptops in favor of the IPAD.  So far no data has been generated to show that this has increased academic scholarship  among the student body.

North has also required all athletes to maintain a "C" average or above to be eligible to participate in athletics.

Notable alumni
 Herbert W. Armstrong (Class of 1910), founder of the Worldwide Church of God.
 Ed Beisser (Class of 1939), All-American basketball player at Creighton University in 1943 and three-time AAU national champion.
MarTay Jenkins (Class of 1993), former NFL wide receiver for the Arizona Cardinals.
Robert Ray Scott (Class of 1939), United States Air Force colonel
 John Tinker (Class of 1968), one of the petitioners in the Supreme Court case Tinker v. Des Moines Schools.
 Roger Williams, pianist made famous for his version of "Autumn Leaves".

See also
 Des Moines Independent Community School District for other schools in the same district.
 List of high schools in Iowa

References

External links
 Des Moines Public Schools Homepage
 North High School Homepage
 President Barack Obama at North (2015)
 Governor Terry Branstad at North High (2015)

Schools in Des Moines, Iowa
Public high schools in Iowa
Iowa High School Athletic Association
1885 establishments in Iowa